The Havering Parks Constabulary is a body of constables responsible for policing the parks and open spaces of the London Borough of Havering.

Organisation and Duties

Constables
The Constabulary is part of Havering Parks Protection Service, and works seven days a week.

Uniformed Support Officers
The Service also includes Uniformed Support officers and a Parks Operative Gate Team dedicated to locking and unlocking various park gates.

Headquarters
The Constabulary and support team are based at the Service's headquarters in Raphael Park, but use motorbikes and off-road vehicles to travel throughout the borough.

Duties
The Parks Constabulary protects and policies Havering park, occasionally they help outside the park in serious conditions.

Powers

Constables
Members of the constabulary are sworn in as constables under article 18 of the Greater London Parks and Open Spaces Order 1967, meaning they have powers of a constable to deal with bye-laws relating to parks and open spaces under their control. Providing a police service and as such do have the powers of arrest, power to seize illicit drugs, carry weapons (such as batons) etc.

Generally in London, parks police/constabularies will pass on all serious crime to the local territorial force, which in this case is the Metropolitan Police to investigate.

Vehicles and equipment
Havering Parks Constabulary use 4x4 marked with "POLICE" and the Parks Constabulary crest, as well as blue and yellow battenburg markings, blue flashing lights and a spotlight.

The motorcycles are also brightly marked and hold the Parks Constabulary crest and blue lights.

Uniform
The constables wear a typical British police uniform, including:

Black peaked cap with black and white chequered cap band & force capbadge
White shirt and black tie
Black jacket
Black trousers
Black boots.

Duty belts, stab vests, high-visibility clothing and motorbike protective clothing are worn where necessary.

See also
Law enforcement in the United Kingdom
List of law enforcement agencies in the United Kingdom, Crown Dependencies and British Overseas Territories
Park police

References

External links
Official website of the Havering Parks Protection Service

London Borough of Havering
Police
Park police forces of London